Lolim (or Lolimi) is a community located in Eastern Equatoria state of South Sudan. It is on the road from Kapoeta to Narus.
Lolim lies just north of the Loyuro River, which has a pool called Lolimi.
The community is mainly made up of Toposa people.

As of 2004, the Catholic Diocese of Torit was operating a center at Lolim serving the displaced.
The Diocese of Torit operates a primary school in the community.
In February 2011, the mobile telephone operator Vivacell stated that they were planning to build transmission boosters in Lolim.

References

Populated places in Eastern Equatoria